That's Bubble Gum – That's Giorgio is the 1969 debut studio album by Italian producer Giorgio Moroder. The album contains the song "Looky, Looky" which was the first hit for Moroder; it was released as a single under the mononymous name "Giorgio".

Track listing
"Looky, Looky" (Moroder, Peter Rainford) - 2:42
"Mendocino" (Doug Sahm, Michael Holm)  - 3:20
"Mercy" (Joey Levine, Steve Feldman) - 2:12
"Make Me Your Baby" (Moroder, Fred Jay) - 4:24
"Sorry Suzanne" (Geoff Stephens, Tony Macaulay) - 4:54
"Yummy, Yummy, Yummy" (Joey Levine, Arthur Resnick) - 2:18
"Bad Moon Rising" (John Fogerty) - 2:20
"Proud Mary" (John Fogerty) - 2:58
"Aquarius/Let the Sunshine In" (James Rado, Gerome Ragni, Galt MacDermot) - 4:28
"Muny, Muny, Muny" (Joachim Heider, Michael Holm) - 3:02
"Gimme Gimme Good Lovin'" (Joey Levine, Ritchie Cordell) - 2:07

References

Giorgio Moroder albums
1969 debut albums
Albums produced by Giorgio Moroder
Casablanca Records albums